Marblehill is an unincorporated community in Pickens County, in the U.S. state of Georgia.

History
The community was named for a marble quarry near the town site. The name sometimes is spelled out as "Marble Hill".  A post office was established at Marblehill in 1889.  The ZIP Code for Marblehill is 30148

References

Unincorporated communities in Pickens County, Georgia
Unincorporated communities in Georgia (U.S. state)